Port Klang Free Zone (PKFZ) is a  commercial and industrial zone established in 2004 in Malaysia. It is a regional distribution hub as well as a trade and logistics centre offering extensive distribution and manufacturing facilities. It is located along the Straits of Malacca, Port Klang, Klang, Malaysia. The PKFZ was previously managed by Jebel Ali Free Zone Authority (JAFZA). However, it was taken over and rebranded by a local company in 2007. The PKFZ offers various investment incentives to investors such as tax exemptions on most products and services, subsidies, allowing wholly foreign owned enterprises, free repatriation of capital and profits and incentives for research and development, training and export.

Transport connections

Port Klang is positioned to take advantage of the Kuala Lumpur International Airport. The KLIA Advance Cargo Center can handle one million tonnes of cargo annually with the capability to expand to 3 million tonnes per year. The center provides integrated logistics services.

The Port is also closely linked to Northport and Westports in Port Klang, the 12th busiest port in the world.

See also
Jebel Ali Free Zone
Port Klang
Port Klang Authority

References

External links
Port Klang Free Zone Integrated Free Zone

2004 establishments in Malaysia
Special economic zones
Political scandals in Malaysia
Ports and harbours of Malaysia
Development Corridors in Malaysia
Foreign trade of Malaysia